is a 1971 Japanese television series. It is the ninth NHK taiga drama.

Story
Shin Heike Monogatari deals with the early Edo period. Based on Sōhachi Yamaoka's novel by the same title.

The story chronicles the life of Yagyū Munenori

Production

Production Credits
Original story – Sōhachi Yamaoka
Music – Akira Miyoshi

Cast

Yagyū Clan
Nakamura Kinnosuke as Yagyū Munenori 
Chitose Kobayashi as Orin
Rumi Matsumto as Karasuma Junko
Hiroshi Akutagawa as Yagyū Munetoshi
Yoshio Harada as Yagyū Jūbei Mitsuyoshi
Ryo Tamura as Yagyū Samon
Koji Shimizu as Yagyū Munefuyu

Tokugawa  Clan
 So Yamamura as Tokugawa Ieyasu
 Tetsuya Aoyama as Tokugawa Hidetada
 Ichikawa Ebizō X as Tokugawa Iemitsu
 Yoko Tsukasa as Lady Kasuga
 Tetsuo Ishidate as Matsudaira Tadateru
 Kazuo Funaki as Tokugawa Tadanaga
 Isao Sasaki as Matsudaira Tadanao

Toyotomi Clan
 Shikaku Nakamura as Toyotomi Hideyoshi
 Tomoko Naraoka as Nene
 Kyōko Kishida as Yodo-dono
 Kataoka Takao as Toyotomi Hideyori
 Atsuo Nakamura as Ishida Mitsunari
 Kazuo Kitamura as Shima Sakon
 Kōjirō Kusanagi as Konishi Yukinaga
 Junshi Shimada as Kimura Shigenari
 Masao Shimizu as Asano Nagamasa
 Etsushi Takahashi as Kuroda Nagamasa
 Shōgo Shimada as Sanada Yukimura
 Masakazu Tamura as Fuwa Bansaku
 Yoshio Tsuchiya as Ōtani Yoshitsugu

Others
 Takahiro Tamura as Takuan Sōhō
 Hideki Takahashi as Sakazaki Naomori
 Shun Oide as Matsudaira Nobutsuna
 Tappie Shimokawa
 Go Wakabayashi as Araki Mataemon
 Akiji Kobayashi as Abe Shigetsugu
 Mitsuko Baisho as Osame
 Tōru Emori as Doi Toshikatsu
 Takashi Shimura as Aoyama Tadatoshi
 Isamu Nagato as Yosa
 Isao Hashizume as Tawara Harunosuke

References

External links

Taiga drama
1971 Japanese television series debuts
1971 Japanese television series endings
1970s drama television series
Jidaigeki television series
Television series set in the 16th century
Television series set in the 17th century
Cultural depictions of Yagyū clan
Cultural depictions of Toyotomi Hideyoshi
Cultural depictions of Tokugawa Ieyasu